Théophile-Abraham Hamel (8 November 1817 – 23 December 1870) was a Canadian artist who painted mainly portraits and religious images in 19th-century Quebec.

Life 
Hamel was born in 1817 in Sainte-Foy (then a suburb of Quebec City), the son of a successful farmer. Hamel's paternal ancestry can be traced to French immigrant Jean Hamel, who arrived in New France from Avremesnil (Normandy) in 1656. In 1834 Théophile was already taking art lessons from Antoine Plamondon. For a while he attended the Accademia di San Luca, in Rome. He was very much interested in the works of the Romantics.

Career
His early portraits show a mixture of European romanticism and Canadian simplicity. His style gradually changed to match the taste of his clients for simple, honest, even prim portraits.

In 1838 he painted 'Three Indian Chiefs Leading a Delegation to Quebec. In 1843, Hamel travelled to Europe (London, Naples, Rome, Florence, Bologna, Venice, and then north to France and Belgium). 
In 1846 he returned to Canada to Quebec. Throughout his career he travelled throughout Canada East and Canada West, painting portraits of such notables as Sir John Beverley Robinson, Denis-Benjamin Viger, Sir Allan MacNab, Louis-Joseph Papineau, John Sandfield Macdonald, and Sir Étienne Taché. He worked quickly, often completing a portrait in a single day.

Hamel also painted religious pictures for various commissions, and a series of "imaginative" or "semi-imaginative" portraits of Jacques Cartier, Samuel de Champlain, Jean Talon, Montcalm, and General James Murray. The image of Cartier even appeared on a banknote. 
It is estimated that Hamel painted more than 2000 portraits during his lifetime. In 1848, he painted portraits of Robert Baldwin and Louis-Hippolyte Lafontaine. In 1850-1, he painted Egerton Ryerson. In 1853, he painted 'Madame Renaud and Her Daughters Wilhemine and Emma'. His painting 'L'Abbé Edouard Faucher', painted in 1855, now hangs at Eglise de Saint-Laurent, Lotbiniere. His painting of Sir Allan MacNab, painted in 1853, hangs in the House of Commons of Canada.

Family
In 1857, at age of 40, he married Mathilde-Georgiana Faribault, daughter of George-Barthélemy Faribault, a pioneer librarian. He died in Quebec City, in December 1870.

Gallery

Works

See also
List of portraits in the Centre Block

Notes

References

External links
 

1817 births
1870 deaths
19th-century Canadian painters
Canadian male painters
Artists from Quebec City
Canadian portrait painters
People from Sainte-Foy, Quebec City
19th-century Canadian male artists